Mordvin Tatars was a term used to refer to medieval nobility of Volga Tatar, Volga Finnic, and Burtas descent serving Grand Duchy of Moscow.

History
The term was used interchangeably with the term Mordvin princes in 15-16th centuries in official documents of Grand Duchy of Moscow. First the term was applied to pagan princes.

Noble Families

Tümen Princes Kugushevs (ethnic Mishar) and Rasts (ethnic Moksha) were mentioned as Mordvin princes. The latter also sometimes referred to as Siberian. Possibly Tyumen and Tümen are mixed.

According to Stefan Kuznetsov: "There are 55 princely families of Mordvin and Mordvin-Tatar descent (e.g. Devlet-Kildeyev, Yedelev (Volga Finnic), Yengalychev,  Yenikeyev (Mishar clan), Kildyushev, Kugushev, Kudashev, Kulomzin (Volga Finnic, disputable Erzya or Meryan), Maksutov, Tenishev, Chevkin, Chegodayev, Shuguruv, etc. some of them use the princely title, others only consider themselves princes"
More princley families list Ivan Smirnov and Vladimir Velʹi͡aminov-Zernov: Yenikeyev (founder Yenikey-murza Kuldyashev of Moksha descent), Shugurov (Moksha), Smilenev (Moksha), Prosandeyev p.94, Alekseyev (Volga Finnic), Andreyev (Volga Finnic), Bayushev, Engalychev, Ichalov (Erzya), Izdebersky (Volga Finnic), Karamzin, Kazurov (Volga Finnic), Kildishev (Volga Finnic), Kizhedeyev (Volga Finnic), Kuprin, Lapin (Volga Finnic), Maksheyev (Moksha),Meshchersky (Moksha), Mokshazarov (Volga Finnic), Mordvinov (Moksha), Mushkubeyev (Volga Finnic), Pavlov (Volga Finnic), Razgildeyev (disputable Volga Tatar or Volga Finnic descent), Romodanov (Volga Finnic), Tyapin (Volga Finnic), Kirdyakov, Sheysupov (Tatar).
"It is important to note that they [Muscovy authorities] as a rule recorded in possessory documents names and ancestral nicknames of only known persons. The names of their more ancient ancestors who had lived there before their lands were annexed do not interest the Muscovy authorities"

Serving People
Burtases are mentioned as Burtases and Posop Tatars interchangeably.

See also
List of Qasim Khans
List of Turkic dynasties and countries

Literature
Vladimir Velyaminov-Zernov. Studies on Kasimovskij kings and princes (published in "Proceedings of the Eastern Division of the Imperial Archaeological Society, Part IX, X, XI, 1863 - 1866, h. XII, 1887

References

Sources

External links

 
 
Qasim Khanate
Grand Duchy of Moscow